Sir Henry Williams (1537 – 6 January 1604), also known as Sir Henry Cromwell, was a knight of the shire (MP) for Huntingdonshire during the reign of Elizabeth I. He was the grandfather of the Protector, Oliver Cromwell.

Early life
Sir Henry Williams, alias Cromwell, was of Welsh descent, the eldest son and heir of Sir Richard Williams (–1544) and Frances (–), daughter of Thomas Murfyn. His grandfather, Morgan ap William, was the son of a man named William, and also used the name Williams, but his father abandoned the Welsh patronymic system completely and adopted the name of Cromwell, in honour of an uncle Thomas Cromwell, 1st Earl of Essex. The family then consistently used and wrote its name as "Williams, alias Cromwell", well into the 17th century.
He was educated at Queens' College, Cambridge.

Career
He was highly esteemed by Queen Elizabeth I, who knighted him in 1564. He was an important enough man, with a large enough house, for the Queen to do him the honour of sleeping at his seat, Hinchingbrooke House, on 18 August 1564, on her return from visiting the University of Cambridge.

Williams, alias Cromwell, was in the House of Commons in 1563, as one of the knights of the shire for Huntingdonshire, and was four times appointed Sheriff of Cambridgeshire and Huntingdonshire, by Elizabeth, viz. in the 7, 13, 22, and 34 years of her reign; and in the 20th, she nominated him a commissioner with others, to inquire concerning the draining of The Fens through Cloughs Cross and so to the sea.

He made Huntingdonshire the entire place of his country residence, living at Ramsey Abbey in the summer, and Hinchingbrooke in the winter; he repaired, if not built, the manor-house at Ramsey, and made it one of his seats. Mark Noble comments that he had heard that the house of Ramsey was only the lodge of that magnificent pile, and converted by Sir Henry into a dwelling-house. Sir Henry also built Hinchingbrooke House adjoining to the nunnery at Hinchingbrooke, and upon the bow windows there he put the arms of his family, with those of several others to whom he was allied.

Mark Noble stated that Sir William was called, from his liberality, the "golden knight"; and reported that in Ramsey it was said, that whenever Sir Henry came from Hinchingbrooke to that place, he threw considerable sums of money to the poor townsmen. This excellent character is given of him, "he was a worthy gentleman, both in court and country, and universally esteemed"; and which his merit justly deserved. By the record of inquisitio post mortem, taken at Ramsey, 2 June, following his death, it appears that he died possessed of these manors in Huntingdonshire, Saltry, Saltry-Moynes, Saltry-Judith, Sawtry-Monastery, all valued at £60 per annum; Warboys and Whistow, with their rectories, and the New-red-deer Park, valued together at £40 per annum; Hinchingbrooke, valued at £10 per annum; Broughton or Broweton, with the rectory, valued at £20 per annum; Berry and Hepmangrove, and the rectory of Berry, valued at £20 per annum; the forests of Waybridge, and Sapley, valued at £6 13s 4d; the farm or grange of Higney, and the messuage called the George, with the land belonging to it, valued at £10 per annum; and the manor of Ramsey, with the farm of Biggin, valued at £100 per annum. all of which were held of king by military service. except the forests of Waybridge and Sapley, together with the farm, or grange of Higney, the tenures of which were unknown.

Marriage and issue
Sir Henry Williams, alias Cromwell, married twice. He married firstly, Joan (d. 1584), daughter of Sir Ralph Warren, twice Lord Mayor of London, by whom he had six sons and five daughters:
 Sir Oliver Cromwell.
 Robert Cromwell (c. 1567 - 1617), married Elizabeth Steward (c. 1560 - London, 1654), by whom he had two children:
 Anne Cromwell, married John Sewster, and had Robina Sewster, wife of Sir William Lockhart, of Lee, Scotland, who held the office of Ambassador to France, and had Robina Lockhart (ca. 1662 - Bothwell Castle, Lanarkshire, 20 March 1740/41), married on 19 August 1679 at Lincoln's Inn Chapel, London, to Archibald Douglas, 1st Earl of Forfar (3 May 1653 – 11 December 1712, bur. Bothwell Church)
 Oliver Cromwell (25 April 1599 – 3 September 1658), Lord Protector of England, Scotland and Ireland
 Henry Cromwell
 Richard Cromwell
 Philip Cromwell
 Ralph Cromwell
 Joan Cromwell (d. c. 1641, her will was probated on 14 December 1641), married Sir Francis Barrington, 1st Baronet (c. 1570 - 3 July 1628)
 Elizabeth Cromwell (c. 1562 – 1664), married William Hampden of Great Hampden, Buckinghamshire, son of Griffith Hampden and his second wife, Anne Cave. They had two sons, including:
 John Hampden
 Frances Cromwell
 Mary Cromwell, married Sir William Dunch, of Little Wittenham, Berkshire (d. 22 January 1610/11), and had Edmund Dunch.
 Dorothy Cromwell, married Thomas Fleming (c. 1572–1624)

Lady Joan died at Hinchinbrooke and was buried there in All Saints' church in 1584.

He married secondly, Susan Weeks (d. 1592), by whom he had no issue, who bore for her arms azure a lion rampant checky argent and gules. She was buried at All Saints', Huntingdon, 11 July 1592 but no monument remains of either Sir Henry or of his wives, or indeed any of the name of Cromwell in that place as Huntingdon was devastated during the Civil War and all the monuments and brass plates to the dead were either destroyed or looted. Lady Susan died of a lingering illness, which in that superstitious age was blamed on witchcraft. On 4 April 1593, in the court presided over by justice Fenner, John Samwell, his wife and daughter were found guilty of causing the death of Joan through witchcraft and executed a few days later (see the Witches of Warboys case).

Death
Sir Henry lived to a good old age, dying 6 January 1604. He was buried in All Saints' Church, Huntingdon, on 7 January. An indication of the funeral pomp used at his interment can be found by the charges of the heralds, which were the same as those incurred at the burial of some of the greatest knights of his day. Sir Oliver, the eldest son, gained the bulk of his fortune, to each of the other sons were given estates of about an annual value of £300.

Notes

Attribution

References

 

 This source cites:

Further reading

External links

 CROMWELL, alias WILLIAMS, Henry (c.1537-1604), of Hinchingbrooke and Ramsey Abbey, Hunts. in The History of Parliament: the House of Commons 1558–1603, ed. P.W. Hasler, 1981.
 Teri Fitzgerald, Sir Richard Cromwell: A King’s Diamond
 The Cromwell Museum, Huntingdon
 Pedigree of Oliver Cromwell

1604 deaths
1537 births
16th-century births
English MPs 1563–1567
Knights Bachelor
English people of Welsh descent
Cromwell family
17th-century English people
High Sheriffs of Cambridgeshire and Huntingdonshire
Alumni of Queens' College, Cambridge